Ayutthaya, Ayudhya, or Ayuthia may refer to:

 Ayutthaya Kingdom, a Thai kingdom that existed from 1350 to 1767
 Ayutthaya Historical Park, the ruins of the old capital city of the Ayutthaya Kingdom
 Phra Nakhon Si Ayutthaya province (locally and simply Ayutthaya)
 Phra Nakhon Si Ayutthaya district, the capital district
 Phra Nakhon Si Ayutthaya (city), the city in Phra Nakhon Si Ayutthaya Province
 HTMS Sri Ayudhya, a ship of the Royal Thai Navy
 Si Ayutthaya Road, a road in downtown Bangkok
 Bank of Ayudhya, a Thai commercial bank
 Ayuthia (cicada), a genus of cicadas

See also
Ayodhya, a city in Uttar Pradesh, India

Ayothaya (disambiguation)